Daniel Lawrence may refer to:

 Dan Lawrence, English cricketer
 Daniel H. Lawrence, American football coach
 Daniel Lawrence (politician), Jamaican politician